Rai Bahadur Tirath Singh Bakshi joined the United Province Police Force during the British Raj and was born between 1850 and 1904 later became Deputy Inspector General of Police of the state.

Singh was awarded the Indian Service Order by King George V, after successfully capturing Sultana, one of the region's most feared dacoits (bandits) in Rohilkhand and Chambal. In the 1940s, he was again honoured by King George VI with the title, Rai Bahadur. He later settled in Dholpur (now in Rajasthan). Adored by the citizens, who proudly called him Bubba Sahibor, he was responsible for bringing order to the Chambal Ravines.

Singh died on 28 February 1948. His burial site is in Dholpur.

Family
He was the second son of S Hoshiar Singh Bakshi and Chanan Devi.

His eldest son Raghunath Singh Bakshi, a close compatriot of Govind Vallabh Pant the Home Minister of India, was seriously involved in India's independence. He died before he could see his dream come true. His second son, Sardar Ranbir Singh bakshi, was a lawyer by profession, who rose to the position of a judge in Dholpur. Like his father Sardar served the Maharaja of Dholpur. He moved to Punjab after India's independence. One of the first to join the Indian Administrative Service, Sardar was the last Chief Secretary Of Patiala and East Punjab States Union (PEPSU). He served as Additional Chief Secretary Punjab when PEPSU and Punjab were merged. He then returned to Patiala and served as Chairman Of the state's Public Service Commission, his 3rd son Birander Singh bakshi who was also in the police, his 4th son Gurdit Singh bakshi was a police officer, his 5th son Mohinder Singh bakshi was also a police officer who was sent to Sikkim as the commissioner of police on deputation he was also the officer in charge to shift the Tenzin Gyatso's treasurers to India from Sikkim, his 7th son Govind Singh Bakshi was also in the police, he resides in Patiala, his daughter Amba Bakshi was married to an army officer.

References

1946 deaths
Indian civil servants
Indian police officers
People from Rajasthan
Rai Bahadurs
Year of birth missing
Punjabi people